Krasnopillya (Ukrainian: Краснопілля) is a railway station in Krasnopillya, Sumy Oblast, Ukraine. The station is on the Sumy Directorate of Southern Railways on the Basy-Pushkarne line.

Krasnopillya is located in between Korchakivka and Pushkarne stations.

Passenger service

Only suburban trains stop at Krasnopillya station.

Notes

 Tariff Guide No. 4. Book 1 (as of 05/15/2021) (Russian) Archived 05/15/2021.
 Arkhangelsky A.S., Arkhangelsky V.A. in two books. - M.: Transport, 1981. (rus.)

References

External Links

Korchakivka on railwayz.info
Suburban train schedule

Railway stations in Sumy Oblast
Sumy
Buildings and structures in Sumy Oblast
Railway stations opened in 1901